Bailando por un Sueño: Primer Campeonato Internacional de Baile (Dancing for a Dream: First International Dance Championship) is a TV show, where celebrities and dancers from different countries that had participated before in the show Bailando por un Sueño compete to win the First International Dance Championship Cup or the Nations Cup. It began on November 4, 2007 and finished on December 16, 2007, hosted by Adal Ramones and Liza Echeverría. The show was aired at 20:00 (-6 GTM) on Sunday, by Canal de las Estrellas.

Format 

This show was based on the format of Bailando por un Sueño. Nine couples (formed by a celebrity and an amateur dancer) competed each week against each other dancing several styles to impress a panel of judges. The judges gave to each performance a score from 1–10.
From the nine scores, there was a secret one, "The Secret Score" from one judge. It was revealed at the end of the show. Also, the highest and the lowest scores were cancelled, to eliminate favoritism.
At the end of each program, the lowest-scored couples were revealed. If a couple received the lowest score of the week three times in a row, it will be eliminated of the competition.

Jury 

There was a judge for each participating country

Couples 

Liza Hernández, former celebrity from Panama, withdrew from the competition in week two due to an infection  in the uterus. She was replaced by Renée Alejandra Celis. 

Gustavo Rojas, former amateur dancer from Argentina, withdrew from the competition in week two due to food poisoning. He was replaced by Maximiliano D'Iorio.

Florencia Gismondi, former celebrity from Paraguay, withdrew from the competition in week three due to an injury to the kneecap. She was replaced by Melissa Quiñonez.

Felipe "Pipe" Hurtado, former amateur dancer from Colombia, withdrew from the competition in week three due to laceration of the left buttock. He was replaced by Mario Andrés Hurtado.

References 

2010s Mexican television series
2007 Mexican television series debuts
2007 Mexican television series endings